Haghartsin is a village in the Dilijan Municipality of the Tavush Province of Armenia. The 13th-century Haghartsin Monastery is located around 8 km northwest of the village.

Toponymy 
It was founded in 1815 as Jarkhech by Prince Jar Artsruni. In 1940, the village was renamed Kuybyshev after the Soviet politician Valerian Kuybyshev. In 1992, the village was renamed Haghartsin, after the nearby Haghartsin Monastery.

Gallery

References

External links 

Populated places in Tavush Province